Phytoclasts are microscopic plant fragments present in the fossil record, usually found in palynological preparations and acid macerations, and include banded tubes and various nematophytes.

References

Fossil record of plants
Prehistoric plants